Čedomir (Cyrillic script: Чедомир) is a masculine given name of Slavic origin. It may refer to:

Čedomir Antić (born 1974), Serbian historian
Čedomir Čupić (born 1947), professor
Čedomir Đoinčević (born 1961), Serbian football coach
Čedomir Janevski (born 1961), Macedonian football coach
Čedomir Jovanović (born 1971), politician
Čedomir Mijanović (born 1980), footballer
Čedomir Mirković (1944–2005), writer
Čedomir Pavičević (born 1978), footballer
Čedomir Vitkovac (born 1982), Serbian basketball player

Slavic masculine given names
Serbian masculine given names